Maya Zack (born in Tel Aviv, Israel, in 1976) is an artist-filmmaker who creates video art and installations.

Biography 
Maya Zack studied at Bezalel Academy of Art and Design in Jerusalem. Her work has been exhibited internationally and earned film awards and art prizes, among them the Isracard and Tel Aviv Museum Prize for an Israeli Artist, Idud Hayetzira Prize – Israeli Ministry of Culture, Adi Prize (Adi Foundation and the Israel Museum Jerusalem), Celeste Kunstpreis Berlin, Israel Lottery Council of the Arts, CCA Tel Aviv.

Solo/group exhibitions include Moscow Biennial for Young Art 2012, MLF Galleria Marie-Laure Fleisch Rome, Alon Segev Gallery Tel Aviv, Galerie Natalie Seroussi Paris, The Jewish Museum New York, LACE L.A., The Jewish Museum Berlin, Tel Aviv Museum of Art, The Israel Museum Jerusalem, California Center for the Arts Museum Escondido, Figge von Rosen Galerie Cologne.

Zack's videos, installations, drawings and computer-generated visualizations deal with the human attempt to impose order and form onto reality in order to cope with its chaotic nature. Her work reflects on the relation between memory and history.

She is a lecturer at Bezalel.

Exhibitions

Solo exhibitions 

2016
 Counterlight, Tel Aviv Museum
 Galleria Marie-Laure Fleisch, Rome, Italy

2014
 Outlined Absence, Manifesta 10's parallel projects, Taiga Space, St. Petersburg
 The Mystical Shabbat, Alon Segev gallery, Tel Aviv

2013
 The Shabbat Room, a permanent installation at The Jewish Museum Vienna
 Maya Zack : Videos, at Moving Image Art fair, London. With Galleria Marie-Laure Fleisch.

2012
 Made to Measure, Galleria Marie-Laure Fleisch, Rome, Italy

2011
 Living Room, The Jewish Museum, New York, U.S.A. Curator: Aviva Weintraub.
 Camera Obscura, Galerie Natalie Seroussi, Paris. Curator: Marie Shek.

2010
 Mother Economy - video and drawings, CUC Gallery, Berlin. Curator: Avi Feldman
 Living Room, Alon Segev Gallery, Tel Aviv
 Black and White Rule – Open Set, Yafo 23, Bezalel Gallery Jerusalem.

2009
 Reading Room, Bialik House Museum, Tel Aviv. Curator: Marie Shek.

2008
 Mother Economy, The Jewish Museum, Media Center Gallery, New York. Curator: Andrew Ingall.
 Nalbishech Salmat Beton Vamelet, Be’eri gallery, Kibutz be’eri. Curator: Ziva Yelin. (with Raya Bruckenthal)

2005
 Videos + drawings, Alon Gallery, Ramat Hasharon

2004
 Concrete and Cement, Noga Gallery, Tel Aviv (with Raya Bruckenthal)
 Mockument, Alon Gallery, Ramat Hasharon

2002
 The Baron E.T. von Home, Artists Studios Gallery, Tel Aviv (with Raya Bruckenthal)

2001
 Hier seid Ihr zusammen, Kav 16 Gallery, Tel Aviv.

Videography 
 Counter-Light (work in progress), 2016
 Black and White Rule, 2011
 Mother Economy, 2007
 Concrete and Cement 2: Door to Door, 2005 
 Meme 2. - The Units, 2004 
 Meme 1, 2003 
 Concrete and Cement 1: Preparations for the Resembling People Ceremony, 2003 
 Hier Seid Ihr Zusammen, 2000.

Awards and residencies 
Artis Grant Program, 2016
Outset Contemporary Art Fund, 2016
Claims Conference, 2016
The Ostrovsky Family Fund, 2015
Israel Lottery Council Grant For Culture and Arts, 2015
The Shpilman institute for Photography, Tel Aviv, 2013
Israel Lottery Council Grant For Culture and Arts, 2012
'Idud Hayetzira' Award, The Israeli Ministry of Culture, 2011
Isracard and Tel Aviv Museum of Art Prize, 2011
Artis Grant, 2011
Adi Prize for Jewish Expression in Art and Design, by Adi Foundation and Israel Museum in Jerusalem, 2010
The New Israeli Foundation for Cinema and Television, 2009
Israel Lottery Council Grant For Culture and Arts, 2008
Celeste Kunstpreis, Art Prize Berlin, 1st prize Artist Category, 2008
Israel Lottery Council Grant For The Arts, 2007
The New Israeli Foundation For Cinema and Television, 2007
The Center of Contemporary Art  Fund for Video, 2005
The Young Artist Award, The Israeli Ministry of Culture, 2005
The Center of Contemporary Art Fund for Video, 2002
Tel Aviv Municipality, The Arts Department, 2002
Excellence Award, Bezalel, Academy of Art and Design, Fine Arts Department, Jerusalem, 2000

Publications 

 Maya Zack: Acting Memory  (Arles: Actes-Sud 2015) 
 Maya Zack: The Shabbat Room (Vienna:  The Jewish museum Vienna and Verlag für moderne Kunst  2014)

Collections 
 Israel Museum Jerusalem 
 Jewish Museum Berlin 
 Tel Aviv Museum of Art
 Jewish Museum Vienna
 Beth Hatefutsoth Museum, Tel Aviv. 
 Daimler Art Collection, Stuttgart/Berlin 
 ORS Doron Sebbag 
 SIP-The Shpilman Institute for Photography Tel Aviv 
 Tiroche Deleon Collection

References

External links 
 Maya Zack homepage
 Maya Zack at the Jerusalem Print Workshop website
 Rooms Furnished With Memories by Rachel Wolf, in Art and Design, New York Times. August 4 2011
 Maya Zack’s Tel Aviv Exhibition Is Genius Marred Only by Self-restraint, Tal Niv, Ha'aretz, Aug 13, 2016
 Salvage and Sabotage - Maya Zack, W.G. Sebald, Walter Benjamin and Chris Marker, A Further Inquiry on Image and Text, by Janet Sternburg, The Times Quotidian.com 2011/11/28
 La memoria odora di Kugel, Manuela De Leonardis. IL MANIFESTO, Italy  Oct. 24 2012
 Maya Zack, l’horreur du temps présent , Ellie Armon Azoulay,  Artpress no' 393. Oct. 2012	                                           

1976 births
Living people
21st-century Israeli women artists
Artists from Tel Aviv
Israeli contemporary artists